The Jo Daviess Conservation Foundation was created as a charitable organization in 1993 to protect open spaces in Jo Daviess County, Illinois. The foundation currently protects 6 areas and participates in protection of a seventh. The area protected by the foundation includes the Driftless Area of northwest Illinois and stretches of the Mississippi River, along with its tributaries and geological structures.

History
When a critical piece of property in the Galena, Illinois area went on sale in 1993, some residents bonded together to acquire that piece of property by forming the foundation. The foundation has since broadened its scope to protect more areas in Jo Daviess County.

Protected areas
Several areas are protected by the foundation:
Buehler Preserve
Casper Bluff Land & Water Reserve
Horseshoe Mound
Schurmeier Teaching Forest
Valley of Eden Bird Sanctuary
Wapello Land & Water Reserve
Galena Gateway Park – co-managed

References

External links 
 

Jo Daviess County, Illinois